Zhao Qi (died 201), courtesy name Binqing, was an official and scholar who lived during the Eastern Han dynasty of China. He wrote the Commentaries on Mencius, one of the few major commentaries on Mencius from that period still in existence.

See also
 Lists of people of the Three Kingdoms

References

 Chen, Shou (3rd century). Records of the Three Kingdoms (Sanguozhi).
 Fan, Ye (5th century). Book of the Later Han (Houhanshu).
 
 Pei, Songzhi (5th century). Annotations to Records of the Three Kingdoms (Sanguozhi zhu).

2nd-century births
201 deaths
Han dynasty politicians from Shaanxi
Han dynasty essayists
Politicians from Xi'an
Writers from Xi'an
Dong Zhuo and associates
Liu Biao and associates
Officials under Cao Cao